Puerto Rico Highway 146 (PR-146) is a road that travels from Arecibo, Puerto Rico to Ciales. This highway begins at PR-123 near Dos Bocas Lake and ends at its junction with PR-145 and PR-149 in downtown Ciales.

Major intersections

See also

 List of highways numbered 146

References

External links
 

146